The 1995 World Men's Handball Championship was the 14th team handball World Championship. It was held in Iceland between 7–21 May 1995. France won the championship. Games were played in Reykjavík, Hafnarfjörður, Akureyri and Kópavogur.

Qualification

Preliminary round

Group A

Group B

Group C

Group D

Knockout stage

Bracket

Round of 16

9–16th place quarterfinals

Quarterfinals

9–12th place semifinals

5–8th place semifinals

Semifinals

Eleventh place game

Ninth place game

Seventh place game

Fifth place game

Third place game

Final

Final standings

Medalists

References

World Handball Championship tournaments
W
H
H
May 1995 sports events in Europe
Sports competitions in Reykjavík
1990s in Reykjavík
Sport in Hafnarfjörður
Sport in Akureyri
Sport in Kópavogur